Tačno d.o.o., commonly referred to as Tanjug Tačno, and sometimes stylized as TANYUG Tačno, is a Serbian news media company that is headquartered in Belgrade, the capital of Serbia. It's English name is Tanyug Correct, which is sometimes stylized as TANYUG Correct.

History
The company Tačno d.o.o., owned by "Minacord media" (majority owner being Željko Joksimović) and "Radiotelevizija Pančevo", was established on 17 November 2020.

On 9 March 2021, the company acquired 10-year rights of defunct Tanjug to use the intellectual property rights and trademarks of the agency. Since then, the company continues to publish news as news media agency under Tanjug brand.

See also
 Media agencies in Serbia

References

External links
 

Mass media companies established in 2020
Companies based in Belgrade
News agencies based in Serbia
Mass media in Belgrade
2020 establishments in Serbia